Ontario Mine Rescue is the program that creates, oversees and evaluates mine rescue training and standards in the province of Ontario. The Ontario Mine Rescue program is administered by Workplace Safety North, part of the prevention arm of the Ontario Ministry of Labour.

History 

Ontario Mine Rescue was born out of the tragedy of the Hollinger Mine fire that claimed the lives of 39 miners in Timmins in 1928. Neither the mine, the town or even the province had the expertise or the resources to respond to save their lives or adequately fight the fire. Mine rescue teams from Pittsburgh had to be called in to extinguish the fire, while recovery operations were left to local mine management. The resulting provincial royal commission recommended the creation of an Ontario Mine Rescue organization under the Department of Mines to respond to underground mine fires.

The 1947 East Malartic Fire marked a major turning point for Ontario Mine Rescue as teams from Timmins, Kirkland Lake and Sudbury responded to a call to help fight a mine fire in Malartic, Quebec. It was the first and only time Ontario Mine Rescue teams responded to an out-of-province emergency. While working together, it became evident each district had different training and maintenance standards. As a result, the position of Senior Mine Rescue Officer was created to ensure province-wide standards in mine rescue training and equipment maintenance were established and maintained.

In 1965 another mine fire in Timmins, this one at the McIntyre Mine, forced the organization to make another change. The underground distance rescue teams had to travel to reach the fire was so great that the two-hour McCaa apparatus was not sufficient to allow them time to fight the fire. In 1966, after investigating and testing different apparatus, the BG174 was purchased to allow for a four-hour capability. The BG174 proved a workhorse for almost 40 years before it was replaced by the BG4.

Ontario Mine Rescue took on added responsibility in 1984 after four miners were trapped and killed in a rockburst at Falconbridge No. 5 Shaft near Sudbury. The Stevenson Commission recommended that the organization's mandate be expanded to conduct training in and respond to non-fire emergencies. Training on non-fire rescue equipment began shortly after.

In January 2001, responsibility for Ontario Mine Rescue was transferred to the Mines and Aggregates Safety and Health Association, now a part of Workplace Safety North (WSN). The program changed from usage of the Draeger BG174 to the Drager BG4 self-contained breathing apparatus. Standardized competency based training programs were developed to ensure consistent delivery of information to mine rescue teams across the province.

Mine rescue stations 
Delaware Station
1988 - Present
Wawa Station
2016 - Present
Kirkland Lake Station
1931 - Present
Onaping Station
1968 - Present
Red Lake Station
1948 - Present
 Sudbury Station
1932 - Present
Thunder Bay Station
1982 - 1987
2006 - Present
Timmins Station
1930 - Present

When mining activity ceases in thea jurisdiction, some stations that had been established for emergency response capability were closed or relocated.

Cobalt
1953 - 1992

Elliot Lake
1958 - 1998

Geraldton
1946 - 1977

Manitouwadge
1977 - 1982
1987 - 2005

Ontario Mine Rescue Provincial Competition

2016 International Mine Rescue Competition

Ontario Mine Rescue hosted the 10th International Mines Rescue Competition (IMRC 2016) in Sudbury, Ontario.  The competition is held every two years by the governing mine rescue body of the host nation or jurisdiction.  The 2016 event marked the first time the competition was held in Canada.

See also
Drägerman and Drägerwoman
Self-contained breathing apparatus

References

External links
2016 International Mines Rescue Competition
Draeger BG4 Breathing Apparatus
Ontario Mine Rescue Official Website
Workplace Safety North Official Website

Mining in Ontario